Joel Gordon (born November 15, 1975) is a Canadian actor, producer and director.

Early life
As a teenager growing up in Scarborough, Joel Gordon received the Harry Jerome Award for the Arts for his work as a young actor. After studying acting at York University, Gordon made his professional stage debut as an actor in George F. Walker's play Heaven, and appeared on the front cover of Eye Weekly on June 4, 2002 for his role as Romeo in Romeo/Juliet Remixed.

Career

As actor
Gordon's first movie appearance as an actor was in Rude, which was screened at Cannes.

In 2008, Gordon appeared in Max Payne as the character Owen Green. Also in 2008, Gordon produced and directed the award-winning television documentary Embracing da Kink, which won the 2008 Golden Sheaf Award for best Documentary in the Arts/Culture category at the Yorkton Film Festival.

As producer
Joel Gordon's work as a television producer has earned three Gemini nominations from the Academy of Canadian Cinema and Television.

CBC Television aired "Wrestling with Destiny" in March 2004, which Gordon produced and directed. It chronicles the life of Olympic and World Wrestling Champion, Daniel Igali. "Wrestling with Destiny" won 5 Leo Awards including Best Sports Program or Series.

One of Gordon's most notable television biographies was a 48-minute documentary on Margaret Atwood entitled Turning Pages: The Life and Literature of Margaret Atwood.

In 2012, he co-created and started production on Love is Moving, a TV series that aired on NRB Network and on Global Television Network in 2013. The television series follows young people who participate in the Love Movement curriculum and then put love into action in their communities.

Gordon's work outside of film and television 
Along with Benjamin Porter in 2010, Gordon co-founded Love Movement, which is a Christian organization, movement and curriculum that promotes a greater understanding of love and how it can be applied through loving God, and loving others. The first national partner to join Love Movement in shaping the curriculum is World Vision Canada. The official launch date for Love Movement is February 14, 2012.

Filmography

References

External links
 V-Formation Productions Inc. home page
 

1975 births
Living people
Black Canadian male actors
Canadian male film actors
Canadian male television actors
Canadian male voice actors
Canadian documentary film producers
Film directors from Toronto
Male actors from Toronto
Film producers from Ontario
Black Canadian filmmakers